North Rauceby is a village and civil parish in the North Kesteven district of Lincolnshire, England.

North Rauceby is a shrunken village, being associated with a partial lost settlement.

The Church of England parish church is dedicated to St Peter, and is situated on Church Lane; it serves both North and South Rauceby and is in the group of churches that includes those of surrounding villages. The village school is Rauceby Primary School, which also serves South Rauceby and other local villages.

North Rauceby is home to Cranwell Aviation Heritage Centre; its site also houses a park for touring caravans. The Rauceby Maize Maze is an attraction during the summer months.

There is no bus service for North Rauceby, except for school children during term time.

References

External links
 

Villages in Lincolnshire
Civil parishes in Lincolnshire
North Kesteven District